Tortoise Matsumoto (トータス松本 Tōtasu Matsumoto, born December 28, 1966, as 松本敦 Atsushi Matsumoto) is the lead singer of the Japanese guitar group, Ulfuls. He has also had a couple of acting roles in TV dramas, starting with Namida o Fuite (涙をふいて) in 2000.

Trigun character Nicholas D. Wolfwood is modeled after him.

Each member is a multi-instrumentalist with all of them at-least being able to provide vocals and guitar and, like the Traveling Wilburys, each uses a pseudonym featuring "Sitone". They formed for a concert on September 23, 2018, at Zepp Tokyo celebrating Teraoka's 25th anniversary as a musician.

Discography

Albums

 TRAVELLER (2003)
 FIRST (2009)
 Myway Highway (2010)
 NEW FACE (2012)
 TWISTIN' THE NIGHT AWAY (2012)

Singles

 "Hatsu Koi no ⁓What'sGoing On⁓ (LITTLE feat. Tortoise Matsumoto)" (2005)
 "OhayoJAPAN (RYO the SKYWALKER & Tortoise Matsumoto)" (2007)
 "Namida o todokete" (2008)
 "Hana no you ni Hoshi no you ni" (2008)
 "Boku ga tsuiteru" (2009)
 "Myoujou" (2009)
 "Straight (Tortoise Matsumoto song)|Straight" (2010)
 "Clear!" (2010)
 "Clear!/Dore dake no asa to yoru o ⁓shuarii samudei⁓" (2010)
 "Happy Hour" (2010)
 "Myway Highway - Single" (2009)
 "Waimokun ekaki uta" (2011)
 "Ue o muite arukou" (2011)
 "Buranko" (2012)
 "Waa!/Charidaa" (2014)
 "L-O-V-E (Fuyumi Sakamato & Tortoise Matsumoto)" (2015)
 "Main Street (Ringo Sheena & Tortoise Matsumoto)" (2017)

References

Japanese male musicians
Japanese male singers
Living people
Musicians from Hyōgo Prefecture
Year of birth missing (living people)